Kalila Khatun, also Kalila Khan, is a Nepali communist politician and a member of the House of Representatives of the federal parliament of Nepal. She was elected under the proportional representation system from CPN UML, filling the reservation seat for women as well as Muslim groups. She is a member of the parliamentary Women and Social Welfare Committee representing the newly formed Communist Party of Nepal (Unified Socialist).

References

Living people
Place of birth missing (living people)
21st-century Nepalese women politicians
21st-century Nepalese politicians
Nepal MPs 2017–2022
Communist Party of Nepal (Unified Socialist) politicians
Nepal Communist Party (NCP) politicians
Nepalese Muslims
Communist Party of Nepal (Unified Marxist–Leninist) politicians
1965 births